Arthur Boyle (1840/1841 – December 10, 1919) was a politician and grocer. He was elected to the House of Commons of Canada in 1887 as a Member of the Conservative Party to represent the riding of Monck. He was defeated by John Brown in the 1891 election, but was acclaimed back into office in 1892 after Brown was unseated. He then continued to represent the riding until its abolition in 1896.

In 1868, he married Annie E. Cormick. Boyle was reeve of Dunnville from 1877 to 1879 and was warden for Haldimand County from 1878 to 1879. He ran unsuccessfully for a seat in the Legislative Assembly of Ontario in the 1886 provincial election.

Arthur Boyle died at his home in Niagara Falls, Ontario on December 10, 1919.

References

External links
 

1840s births
1919 deaths
Conservative Party of Canada (1867–1942) MPs
Members of the House of Commons of Canada from Ontario
People from Thorold
Mayors of places in Ontario